Wadule, is a small village in Parner taluka in Ahmednagar district of state of Maharashtra, India. The village is 5 km away from Ralegan Siddhi, which is hometown of veteran socialist Anna Hazare.

Population
Approximately 570

Religion
The majority of the population in the village is Hindu.

Language
The people here speak Marathi

Economy
The majority of the population has farming as their primary occupation. This village majorly produces Onions & Jowar. Recently they have been producing Pomegranate. Agriculture is partially mechanized.

Water resources
There are many wells in the village and are primary source of water. The village also has a lake and few bore wells. Recently the farmers have built farm-lakes.

People
Sambhaji Pathare an eminent educationist hails from wadule. He worked as a member of all authorities of Savitribai Phule Pune University. He also worked as a member of consultative group of Planning commission of India. He visited Israel(twice), Germany & UAE.
Jaydeep Pathare

Families
Families with last names Gaikwad, Bhapkar, Pathare, Khamkar, Gat, Rokde reside here.

See also
 Parner taluka
 Villages in Parner taluka

References

Villages in Parner taluka
Villages in Ahmednagar district